The first European Athletics Team Championships took place on 20 and 21 June 2009. The track and field athletics tournament run by European Athletics was the successor of the old European Cup competition which was held annually until 2008. The Championships saw a number of new rules introduced, which were criticised by some athletes and observers.

New rules
The European Team Championships modified and added to the rules of its predecessor competition, the European Cup. Men and women's team competed under one unified national banner for the first time. Furthermore, the competition was opened to all European Athletics member states and was divided into four leagues: the Super League, First League, Second League, and Third League. The top two leagues each comprised twelve competing nations, while the Second and Third Leagues had eight and fourteen teams, respectively.

Elimination rules were added to the 3000 metres, 3000 metres steeplechase, and 5000 metres races. In the shorter races, the athlete in last place when five, four, and three laps were remaining was eliminated. In the 5000 m the cut off points were at seven, five, and three laps remaining. The rule change caused some confusion in the women's 3000 m when Spain's Natalia Rodríguez was eliminated with three laps remaining, but carried on running and eventually won the race. She was disqualified, however, and Russia's Gulnara Galkina-Samitova was announced as the winner. Rodriguez said that she thought the elimination stage came at a later point in the race, and winner Galkina-Samitova was critical of the change, stating "This new elimination rule shouldn't exist. Everyone should race till the end". Further problems arose in the men's 5000 m, when four athletes reached the five laps remaining mark at the same time. The group slowed, unable to tell who was eliminated, and while awaiting the photo-finish the four dropped away from the other runners. Race winner Mo Farah complied with the elimination rule but stated that every athlete had a right to finish, branding the rule change as "strange". Sections of the press also expressed reservations about the changes.

Other rule changes included a 'no false start rule' in all the track events. (Any athlete false starting would have been immediately disqualified and received no points, but this did not occur at the inaugural championships). Athletes in the high jump and pole vault events were permitted a maximum total of four fouls throughout the day's competition. Also, the jumping and throwing events featured elimination rounds: athletes had two trial attempts, then the six best-ranked athletes had a third attempt, then finally the top four athletes had a fourth attempt. The elimination rounds caused some upsets, with highly rated Russian hammer thrower, Aleksey Zagornyi failing to progress beyond the trial rounds.

Many athletes did not fully support the new regulations, and European Athletics President Hansjörg Wirz accepted that the rules needed refinement. However, he was pleased with the competition's reception and stated that the rule changes would make athletics more accessible to a wider audience. Portugal's Rui Silva, who won the 1500 metres, remarked that although the regulations had unusual outcomes, a positive approach to the rules, and further refinement, would be beneficial to the sport.

Calendar

League positions
The leagues for the 2009 competition were formed by combination of each country's men and women's performances in the European Cup 2008. As the teams were 46, the winning team received 46 points, the second 45 and so on. The leagues were formed as:

Super League
Place: Estádio Dr. Magalhães Pessoa, Leiria, Portugal

Participating countries

Men's events

Women's events

Final standings

New standing points after Russian athletes’ late disqualification.

Score table

Records

First League
 Place: Fana Stadion, Bergen, Norway

Participating countries

Men's events

Women's events

Final standings

Records

Second League
Place: Banská Bystrica, Slovakia

Participating countries

Men's events

Women's events

Final standings

Records

Third League
Place: Sarajevo, Bosnia and Herzegovina

Participating countries

 Athletic Association of Small States of Europe()

Men's events

Women's events

Final standings

Records

References

External links
Super League results (archived)
 Second League Official Website

European Athletics Team Championships
European
2009 in European sport